The 1991 FA Charity Shield (also known as the Tennent's FA Charity Shield for sponsorship reasons) was the 69th FA Charity Shield, the annual football match contested by the reigning champions of the Football League First Division and the holders of the FA Cup. It was held at Wembley Stadium, on 10 August 1991. The game was played between Arsenal, champions of the 1990–91 Football League and Tottenham Hotspur, who beat Nottingham Forest to win the 1991 FA Cup Final. This was Arsenal's twelfth Charity Shield appearance and Tottenham Hotspur's sixth.

Arsenal began the match the brighter of the two teams, dominating in possession and the number of chances created. Tottenham created their best chance to score in the first half, but struggled to find a breakthrough in the second half, hardly troubling the Arsenal defence. With neither team able to score after 90 minutes, the match ended in a draw, meaning each team held the trophy for six months each. This was the last Shield edition to have shared winners.

Background
Arsenal qualified for the 1991 FA Charity Shield, by virtue of winning the 1990–91 Football League First Division, having lost one match – away to Chelsea – in the entire campaign. This was the club's eleventh Charity Shield appearance; Arsenal won seven previous shields (1930, 1931, 1933, 1934, 1938, 1948, 1953) and lost four (1935, 1936, 1979, 1989) previously. Tottenham Hotspur qualified as holders of the FA Cup, beating Nottingham Forest 2–1 in the 1991 FA Cup Final. They appeared in five previous shields, winning four outright (1921, 1951, 1961, 1962), sharing two (1967, 1981) and losing two (1920, 1982).

The last meeting between both teams was in the FA Cup; Tottenham Hotspur won 3–1 in the semi-final at Wembley Stadium. Tottenham were the only league opponents to avoid defeat against Arsenal, with neither side scoring in the two matches played. Manager Peter Shreeves noted the importance of the match, given this was a North London derby, but stressed there "will be more important objectives this season." This was the first all-London encounter in the 83-year history of the Shield. This would be the last time either team was to share the trophy, as new regulations were brought in a year later that allowed for extra time and subsequently a penalty shootout if a draw occurred in normal time.

Match
Anders Limpar was the main absentee for Arsenal, having sustained a knee injury, on duty for the Swedish national team. David O'Leary started in place of the injured Steve Bould; midfielder David Hillier was selected ahead of Michael Thomas in Limpar's place on the left wing. Tottenham defender Terry Fenwick, recovered from a double leg break, replaced Justin Edinburgh in the first eleven. Without Paul Gascoigne, injured in the FA Cup final, Tottenham employed a five-man midfield with Gary Lineker as the sole striker.

Summary
Arsenal began brightly in front of a crowd of 65,483, creating the first chance of the match in the 17th minute. Paul Davis set up striker Kevin Campbell, who hooked the ball high over goal. Four minutes later, Alan Smith headed the ball into the goal net, meeting a cross from Paul Merson; it was ruled out by referee Terry Holbrook for offside. Tottenham improved shortly after, with Gary Mabbutt heading the ball directly at Arsenal goalkeeper David Seaman to create their first chance of the match. Their best opportunity to score was in the 36th minute. Vinny Samways set up Gary Lineker to break past the Arsenal defence. Having nudged the ball past Tony Adams, Lineker looked up, before making a cross for Nayim to head; the shot was acrobatically saved by Seaman's right foot.

Early in the second half, Tottenham's Pat van den Hauwe was cautioned by Holbrook for getting tangled with Arsenal's David Rocastle, in spite Rocastle indicating that the player used an elbow – a bookable offence. Moments after, Rocastle was shown a yellow card for attempting to get his own back on Van Den Hauwe, by tackling the player without intent. Van Den Hauwe was later booked for a wild challenge on Lee Dixon. Arsenal dominated possession during the second half, with Tottenham infrequently troubling their opponent's defence and relying on counterattacks to fashion goal-scoring chances. Smith had a chance saved in the 75th minute by goalkeeper Erik Thorstvedt, when the ball was back-passed across the penalty area by Steve Sedgley. In the final seconds of the match substitute Andrew Cole, who had replaced Campbell, shot from 20 yards and into the side-netting.

Details

Statistics

Post-match
Despite the draw, Shreeves was content with his team's performance. He believed the new 4–5–1 formation deployed in the match was "the system which suits us best", but admitted the midfield needed to do more to support Lineker upfront. Arsenal manager George Graham agreed that his team played below their usual standard in the first half, accepting that his team needed "to work on ... finishing" to make use of their territorial advantage.

See also
1990–91 Football League
1990–91 FA Cup

References

1991
Charity Shield 1991
Charity Shield 1991
Comm